The rue Saint-Jacques (in French, literally "Saint James Street"), is a street in a number of cities, including:
 Rue Saint-Jacques (Montreal), Canada
 Rue Saint-Jacques, Paris, France

See also
 St James Street (disambiguation)